Alhassan Cole (born July 15, 1955) is a Sierra Leonean politician who has been the district council chairman of the Western Area Rural District since 2008. He was re-elected as council chairman of the Western Area Rural District in the 2012 Sierra Leone local council elections. He is a prominent member of the All People's Congress party.

References

External links
District chairman Alhassan Cole making a statement

All People's Congress politicians
1955 births
Living people
Fourah Bay College alumni
People from Waterloo, Sierra Leone